Vert-Toulon is a commune in the Marne department in north-eastern France. It had a population of 286 in 2019. As of 2019, there are 159 dwellings in the commune, of which 129 primary residences.

See also
Communes of the Marne department

References

Verttoulon